The I Pan American Sports Festival (Spanish: Festival Deportivo Panamericano) was a multi-sport event held between 11 July and 30 September 2014 in Mexico.  The Festival was organized by the Pan American Sports Organization (PASO).

Venues
The Festival was held at various locations throughout Mexico.

The Games

Participating nations

Sports 

Aquatic sports

Canoeing

Gymnastics

Roller skating

Medals table 

Source: Official website (archived)

References

External links
 Official website

 
2014
Pan American Sports Festival
Multi-sport events in Mexico
International sports competitions hosted by Mexico
Pan American Sports Festival
Qualification tournaments for the 2015 Pan American Games
Pan American Sports Festival
Sports festivals in Mexico
2010s in Mexico City
Pan American Sports Festival
Pan American Sports Festival
Pan American Sports Festival